Remo Manelli (born 13 November 1942) is a Luxembourgian fencer. He competed in the individual and team épée events at the 1972 Summer Olympics.

References

External links
 

1942 births
Living people
Luxembourgian male épée fencers
Olympic fencers of Luxembourg
Fencers at the 1972 Summer Olympics